CBS Dream Team (suffixed with ...It's Epic! before October 3, 2020) is an American programming block that is programmed by Hearst Media Production Group (formerly Litton Entertainment), and airs weekend mornings on CBS under a time-lease agreement as a replacement for the WildBrain-produced animation block Cookie Jar TV. The block features six half-hours live-action documentary and lifestyle series aimed at teenagers between the ages of 13 and 18, which are designed to comply with educational programming requirements defined by the Federal Communications Commission (FCC) under the Children's Television Act.

History

On July 24, 2013, CBS announced that it had entered into a programming agreement with Litton Entertainment to launch a new weekend morning block featuring live-action lifestyle, wildlife, and documentary series aimed at preteens and teenagers between the ages of 10 and 18. Litton recently programmed a Saturday morning block for ABC, Litton's Weekend Adventure, which debuted on September 3, 2011, in an agreement in which the block was syndicated to that network's owned-and-operated stations and affiliates (it subsequently began producing a similarly formatted block for CBS sister network The CW on October 4, 2014). CBS' decision to restructure the block away from the traditional fare of animated and live-action scripted series – which it had been airing at the time of the deal as part of Cookie Jar TV (which had aired on the network in various forms since 2006), a block produced by Canada-based Cookie Jar (now WildBrain) was done in part to comply to secure educational content and advertising regulations in the Children's Television Act.

The CBS Dream Team, launched on September 28, 2013, being the successor to Cookie Jar TV, this marked the second time that CBS carried an exclusively live-action block for younger audiences on weekends mornings, having previously produced an E/I-compliant block called Think CBS Kids from September 13, 1997, to September 26, 1998. The Dream Team block's initial lineup consisted mainly of newer series; however, the cooking series Recipe Rehab also migrated to the Dream Team from Litton's Weekend Adventure for its third season. Shortly before the block debuted, Litton reached a distribution agreement with the American Forces Network to televise the block to provide educational content to military children overseas. All of the block's programming features Descriptive Video Service for the visually impaired on the second audio program channel.

On March 20, 2018, CBS and Litton announced that the block was renewed for four more seasons, with the current contract scheduled to end in 2023.

Programming
Although programs featured on CBS Dream Team are designed to meet federally mandated educational programming guidelines, some CBS stations may carry syndicated educational programs to provide supplementary E/I content. Some programs aired within the block may be deferred to Sunday morning slots, or (in the case of affiliates in the Western United States) Saturday afternoons due to breaking news, severe weather coverage, or regional or select national sports broadcasts (especially in the case of college football and basketball tournaments) scheduled in earlier Saturday timeslots as makegoods to comply with the E/I regulations. Some stations may air the entirety of the Dream Team block on tape delay to accommodate local weekend morning newscasts, CBS Saturday Morning or other programs of local interest (such as real estate or lifestyle programs). This is Litton Entertainment's only block to currently air its first programs. Lucky Dog is the longest-running series on the block as of September 2021. Another series on the block, All In was in production from 2013 to 2015, but did not air for the next five seasons; it returned for reruns starting in the 2020–21 season.

Current programming

Former programming

References

External links
 
 Syndicated Network Television Association page

CBS Television Network
Litton Entertainment
Brokered programming
Television programming blocks in the United States
Television shows featuring audio description